Claire Jane McLachlan (sometimes McLachlan-Smith) is a New Zealand teaching academic. She is currently professor and dean at Federation University Australia. Her speciality is early-childhood literacy.

Career
McLachlan did a M.A (Hons, 1st class) by thesis at Massey entitled  'Experience as a mother of a "crying baby": a single collaborative case study'  completed in 1991, and then a PhD  'Emergent literacy in New Zealand kindergartens : an examination of policy and practices'  in 1996. Between 2000 and 2006 she worked in Auckland at the University of Auckland and Auckland University of Technology before returning to Massey University, where she rose to full professor in 2013. She then moved to Waikato University as professor and head of school. She is currently professor and dean of the school of education at Federation University Australia.

Selected works 
 Makin, Laurie, Criss Jones-Diaz, and Claire McLachlan, eds. Literacies in childhood: Changing views, challenging practice. Elsevier Australia, 2007.
 McLachlan, Claire, Marilyn Fleer, and Susan Edwards. Early childhood curriculum: Planning, assessment, and implementation. Cambridge University Press, 2013.
 McLachlan, Claire, Lucila Carvalho, Nicky de Lautour, and Koshila Kumar. "Literacy in early childhood settings in New Zealand: An examination of teachers' beliefs and practices." Australian Journal of Early Childhood 31, no. 2 (2006): 31–42.
 McLachlan, Claire. "An analysis of New Zealand's changing history, policies and approaches to early childhood education." Australasian Journal of Early Childhood 36, no. 3 (2011): 36.

References

External links
 
 
 Institutional Homepage

Living people
Academic staff of the Federation University Australia
New Zealand women academics
Massey University alumni
Academic staff of the University of Auckland
Academic staff of the Auckland University of Technology
Academic staff of the Massey University
Academic staff of the University of Waikato
New Zealand educational theorists
Year of birth missing (living people)